Thomas Bowden may refer to:
 Thomas Adolphus Bowden (1824–1906), English-born New Zealand Anglican clergyman, farmer, teacher and educationalist
 Thomas Russell Bowden (1841–1893), Attorney General of the Restored Government of Virginia